Björn-Ola Linnér (born 1963) is a Swedish climate policy scholar and professor at Linköping University. He is program director of Mistra Geopolitics, a research programme that critically examines and explores the interplay between the dynamics of geopolitics, human security, and global environmental change. He is also affiliated at the Institute for Science, Innovation and Society at Oxford University and the Stockholm Environment Institute.

Biography
Linnér was born in 1963, Sweden. He received a PhD degree in 1998 on the dissertation The world household: Georg Borgström and the postwar population–resource crisis., which was later reworked into the book The Return of Malthus: Environmentalism and
Postwar Population–Resource Crises, where he analyses neo-Malthusianism in conservationism, environmentalism and in international politics in the 20th century. In 2008, he was appointed professor at the Department of Thematic Studies – Environmental Change at Linköping University.

Linnér is currently program director of Mistra Geopolitics, a research programme that critically examines and explores the interplay between the dynamics of geopolitics, human security, and global environmental change. He is also affiliated as a researcher at the Institute for Science, Innovation and Society at Oxford University and the Stockholm Environment Institute.

Linnér's climate policy research focuses on societal transformations to sustainability, linkages between climate and sustainable development policy, international climate
governance and tools for climate visualization.

He is associate editor of the Oxford research encyclopedia of climate science and editorial board member of the Science in Society series, Sustainability, and Current Sustainable/Renewable Energy Reports.

He is advisor to international organisations, ministries and agencies as well as industry and civil society organisations. He has been scientific expert in the Swedish delegation to negotiations of the Synthesis Report of the Intergovernmental Panel on Climate Change. He held the Research and Independent NGO constituency's address at the High-level segment of UNFCCC Conference (Copenhagen 2009). He is a fellow of the Royal Swedish Academy of Agriculture and Forestry and a member of the Research Council of the Swedish Environmental Protection Agency.

Linnér is frequently engaged in public debate on international climate policy.

Selected bibliography 

Books
Björn-Ola Linnér, Victoria Wibeck. Sustainability Transformations: Agents and Drivers across Societies (Cambridge University Press; 2019)
Benjamin Sovacool, Björn-Ola Linnér. The Political Economy of Climate Adaptation (Palgrave Macmillan; 2015)
Björn-Ola Linnér. The Return of Malthus: Environmentalism and Postwar Population–Resource Crises (Whitehorse Press; 2003)
Articles
Karin Bäckstrand, Jonathan Kuyper, Björn-Ola Linnér, Eva Lövbrand (2017) Non-state actors in global climate governance: from Copenhagen to Paris and beyond. Environmental Politics (journal) 26, 561-579 
Sirkku Juhola, Erik Glaas, Björn-Ola Linnér, Tina Neset (2016). Redefining maladaptation. Environmental Science & Policy. 55,135-40 
Christer Karlsson, Charles Parker, Mattias Hjerpe, Björn-Ola Linnér (2011). Looking for leaders: Perceptions of climate change leadership among climate change negotiation participants. Global Environmental Politics 11, 89–107 
Benjamin Sovacool,Björn-Ola Linnér, Michael Goodsite (2015). The political economy of climate adaptation. Nature Climate Change, 2015. 5, 616-618.

References

External links
Full publication list Björn-Ola Linnér, Linköping University Electronic Press

1963 births
Academic staff of Linköping University
Living people